Fritz Sittig Enno Werner von Hanstein (3 January 1911 – 5 March 1996) nicknamed "Huschke von Hanstein", was a German racing driver who from the 1950s served both as Porsche's public relations manager and chief of their racing department.

Biography
Hanstein was born in Halle, German Empire, to a Prussian noble family which originated in the Eichsfeld. His father, Carlo von Hanstein (1875–1936) was a Prussian Army officer and Junker.

In 1936 "Huschke" entered the Olympic event "Internationale Olympia-Automobil-Stern-Fahrt" (more details here - http://riley-cars.co.uk/Paul-Abt.php), in the late 1930s he drove a BMW 328 sports car. As he had joined the SS, his car was fitted with SS rune number plates (SS-333). In 1940, he, together with Walter Bäumer, won the Mille Miglia in a BMW 328 coupe. He was one of the only three non-Italians to have won the Mille Miglia, along with fellow German and 1931 winner Rudolf Caracciola and 1955 winner Stirling Moss.

As a result of World War II, Hanstein's family's possessions were lost in socialist East Germany. In June 1950, he married Ursula von Kaufmann (1916–2005) on the Nürburgring race track. After the war, Hanstein began a new career. In 1950, he joined Volkswagen in the press department and in 1951, moved to Porsche, where he was head of public relations and race director from 1952 to 1968. Hanstein joined Porsche, then a small sports car manufacturer, serving as a kind of ambassador especially to foreign markets like France, which were rather difficult for Germans at the time. He became the face of Porsche to the motorsports world and press, a perfect partner for Ferry Porsche's more quiet leadership. Due to his aristocratic background and diplomatic skills, he succeeded both in selling cars as well as passing technical inspections before races, like at the 24 Hours of Le Mans where he led Porsche 356 to class wins.

In 1956, Hanstein drove a Porsche 550 Spyder all the way to Sicily to enter in the Targa Florio, for which he hired Umberto Maglioli. The experienced Italian did most of the driving in the long distance race across the mountains, scoring Porsche's first major win. Hanstein led the Porsche racing teams until the middle of the 1960s, when Porsche decided to let young engineers like Ferdinand Piëch take over. Without Hanstein's aristocratic skills, the Porsche team promptly ran into trouble at 1968 24 Hours of Le Mans due to misunderstandings with the French.

Huschke von Hanstein, the so-called "racing baron", continued to serve as representative in German and international automobile organizations. During the mid-1970s, he was the German representative for the Commission Sportive Internationale (CSI), the organization responsible for all racing regulations for Formula One. He died in 1996 in Stuttgart.

Racing statistics

Le Mans results

Sebring results

References

Bibliography
 Fritz Huschke von Hanstein: Automobilsport : Training, Technik, Taktik, Rowohlt, 1978, rororo-Sachbuch, 
 Tobias Aichele: Huschke von Hanstein. Der Rennbaron, 287 Seiten, Verlag Könemann, 1999, English version  .
 Ursula von Hanstein: Erzähl doch mal..., 2000, German
Genealogisches Handbuch des Adels, Adelige Häuser A Band XV, Seite 226, Band 71 der Gesamtreihe, C. A. Starke Verlag, Limburg (Lahn) 1979, .

External links 
 German Wikipedia entry: Fritz Huschke von Hanstein
 Fritz Huschke von Hanstein (motorsportmemorial.org)

 Museum Sinsheim special exhibition: The Racing Baron Huschke von Hanstein
Huschke von Hanstein profile at The 500 Owners Association

1911 births
1996 deaths
German racing drivers
German untitled nobility
Sportspeople from Halle (Saale)
People from the Province of Saxony
SS personnel
Racing drivers from Saxony-Anhalt
World Sportscar Championship drivers
Formula One team principals
Porsche people
Targa Florio
BMW people